Kirk Baily (February 2, 1963 – February 28, 2022) was an American actor.

He was best known for his role as Kevin "Ug" Lee on the Nickelodeon sitcom Salute Your Shorts, and later for his voice acting roles in animation and video games.

Early life
Baily was born in Adrian, Michigan on February 2, 1963.

His father Harold Baily was a Navy veteran from Adrian, and his mother Barbara Baily (née Moats) a teacher from Ney, Ohio.

Baily cited Abbott and Costello, Dick Van Dyke, The Three Stooges and Tim Conway as early creative influences since he and his four brothers enjoyed watching them on television.

Education
He graduated from Adrian High School in 1981, where he was a baseball player and swimmer.

Baily graduated from the Theatre program at Miami University in 1985 after starring in their production of The Front Page that same year. He was a member of Ohio Lambda, Miami University's Phi Kappa Psi fraternity.

He moved to New York after college to further study theatre. After moving to Los Angeles in 1991 to pursue acting full-time, he performed with The Groundlings and The Second City while working as an acting coach.

Career

Baily starred as camp counselor Kevin "Ug" Lee on the popular Nickelodeon sitcom Salute Your Shorts from 1991 to 1992.

He had a recurring role as Greg Madigen during the final season of Melrose Place in 1999.

Baily found success as a voice actor, starring as Tetsuya Kajiwara in Fushigi Yûgi, Millions Knives in Trigun, and Shin in Cowboy Bebop. He also worked doing ADR looping for film and television.

Personal life

Baily ruptured his left ear drum after diving into Franklin Canyon Lake while filming the Salute Your Shorts episode "Ug's Girlfriend is Coming" in 1991, causing permanent hearing loss.

He was married to Peggy Ziegler from 1993 until their divorce in 2019. They had two children, Bella Clare and Bowen.

Baily and Michael Ray Bower were groomsmen for the wedding of their former Salute Your Shorts castmate Danny Cooksey in 1998.

He is survived by his partner, actress Ranjani Brow and his two children.

Death

Baily tested positive for lung cancer in August 2021, but stated he would continue to do dubbing projects as long as he was able to. He died in Los Angeles from heart failure caused by the disease on February 28, 2022, at the age of 59.

Paws of Fury: The Legend of Hank and DC League of Super-Pets were his final projects and both were dedicated in his memory.

Sam Roberts memorialized Baily on the March 2, 2022, episode of Sam Roberts Now.

A celebration of life was held for Baily in Pasadena, California on May 21, 2022.

Filmography

Live-action

Voice

Anime

Film

Video games

References

External links

1963 births
2022 deaths
20th-century American male actors
21st-century American male actors
American male television actors
American male video game actors
American male voice actors
Deaths from lung cancer in California
Miami University alumni
People from Adrian, Michigan